Vakhtang Balavadze (20 November 1927 – 25 July 2018) was a Georgian welterweight freestyle wrestler. He competed at the 1956 and 1960 Olympics and won a bronze medal in 1956. He won the world title in 1954 and 1957, and was a runner-up in 1959. Domestically Balavadze won the Soviet title in 1952–55 and 1957, placing second in 1956 and 1959. He retired from competition following the 1960 Olympics to become a wrestling coach and referee. Balavadze died on July 25, 2018 at the age of 90.

References

External links
 

1927 births
2018 deaths
People from Imereti
Olympic wrestlers of the Soviet Union
Wrestlers at the 1956 Summer Olympics
Wrestlers at the 1960 Summer Olympics
Male sport wrestlers from Georgia (country)
Olympic bronze medalists for the Soviet Union
Olympic medalists in wrestling
Medalists at the 1956 Summer Olympics
Burevestnik (sports society) athletes